Winsen can refer to:

Winsen (Luhe) (also: Winsen an der Luhe), capital of the district Harburg, Lower Saxony, Germany
Winsen an der Aller, a municipality in the district of Celle, Lower Saxony, Germany
Winsen, Schleswig-Holstein, a municipality in the district of Segeberg, Schleswig-Holstein, Germany

See also 
Winssen, a village in Gelderland, Netherlands